48th Street may refer to:
48th Street (Sacramento RT), Sacramento, California
48th Street (Manhattan), New York City

See also
48th Street Theatre